The 1960 Davis Cup was the 49th edition of the Davis Cup, the most important tournament between national teams in men's tennis. 28 teams entered the Europe Zone, 6 teams entered the America Zone, and 6 teams entered the Eastern Zone. South Korea made its first appearance in the tournament.

The United States defeated Venezuela in the Americas Inter-Zonal final, the Philippines defeated India in the Eastern Zone final, and Italy defeated Sweden in the Europe Zone final. In the Inter-Zonal Zone, the United States defeated the Philippines in the semifinal, and then Italy defeated the United States in the final. In the Challenge Round Italy were defeated by the defending champions Australia. The final was played at White City Stadium in Sydney on 26–28 December. It was Italy's first appearance in a Davis Cup final, and it was the first final not to feature the United States since 1936.

America Zone

North & Central America Zone

South America Zone

Americas Inter-Zonal Final
United States vs. Venezuela

Eastern Zone

Draw

Final
Philippines vs. India

Europe Zone

Draw

Final
Sweden vs. Italy

Inter-Zonal Zone

Draw

Semifinals
Philippines vs. United States

Final
Italy vs. United States

Challenge Round
Australia vs. Italy

References

External links
Davis Cup Official Website

 
Davis Cups by year
Davis Cup
Davis Cup
Davis Cup
Davis Cup
Davis Cup